Marie Watson is a former international lawn bowler from New Zealand.

Bowls career
She won a gold medal in the women's pairs with Judy Howat at the 1990 Commonwealth Games in Auckland.

Two years later she won a silver medal in the fours at the 1992 World Outdoor Bowls Championship in Ayr.

In addition to the major championship successes, Watson won nine medals at the Asia Pacific Bowls Championships, including two gold medals in the triples and fours during the 1995 tournament at Dunedin.

She has won six New Zealand National Bowls Championships titles; (1996, 1997, 1999 & 2003 singles), (1987 pairs) and (1995 fours) when bowling for various bowls clubs.

References

New Zealand female bowls players
Commonwealth Games gold medallists for New Zealand
Commonwealth Games medallists in lawn bowls
Bowls players at the 1990 Commonwealth Games
Bowls players at the 1994 Commonwealth Games
Living people
1945 births
Medallists at the 1990 Commonwealth Games